Itamunua Maverinjono Keimuine (born 1 May 1993) is a Namibian footballer who currently plays as a midfielder for Dire Dawa City in the Ethiopian Premier League and for the Namibia national football team.

Club career
Keimuine started his career at Tura Magic, and in 2012–13 season helped them in an important relegation battle by scoring in a 3–1 win against Mighty Gunners. He helped Magic to a strong third place finish in the 2013–14 and 2015–16 seasons.

On 30 September 2018, he joined Ethiopian side Dire Dawa City, thus becoming the first Namibian player to play in Ethiopia.

International career
Keimuine was called up for the Namibia U20's for the 2013 African U-20 Championship qualification, but were knocked out in the preliminary round, after losing 4–1 on aggregate to Rwanda. He subsequently became a regular in the squad and played in the FESA Cup in Angola.

On 1 September 2014, Keimuine got his first national callup after he was named in Namibia's 23-man squad by coach Ricardo Mannetti, for a friendly against Swaziland. The game ended in a 1–1 draw. In May 2015, Keimuine was part of the Namibian squad which won the 2015 COSAFA Cup. On 21 June 2016, he scored his first ever international goal in a 3–0 win against Mozambique in the 2016 COSAFA Cup. On 3 January 2019, he was named in Namibia's 23-man squad for the 2018 CHAN finals in Morocco. Namibia defeated Ivory Coast, Uganda and drew against Zambia to finish second in the group behind Zambia, and qualified for the next round. They were knocked out of the tournament in the quarter-finals by hosts and eventual champions Morocco.

On 23 May 2019, Keimuine was named in Namibia's 23-man squad for the 2019 Africa Cup of Nations in Egypt. In Namibia's opening match against Morocco, he finished Hakim Ziyech’s well-placed cross past his own goalkeeper just 10 minutes after coming on, thus scoring an own goal.

Stats

International goals
Scores and results list Namibia's goal tally first.

Honours

National team

COSAFA Cup (1): 2015

References

External links

Living people
1993 births
Footballers from Windhoek
2018 African Nations Championship players
Namibia A' international footballers
Namibian expatriate footballers
Association football midfielders
2019 Africa Cup of Nations players
Expatriate footballers in Ethiopia
Dire Dawa City S.C. players
Namibia international footballers
Tura Magic F.C. players
Namibian expatriate sportspeople in Ethiopia
Namibian men's footballers